This is a list of players who played at least one game for the Calgary Cowboys (1975–76 to 1976–77) of the World Hockey Association (WHA).



A
John Arbour,

B
Ken Baird,
Yvon Bilodeau,
Jim Boyd,
Gary Bromley,

C
Terry Caffery,
Ron Chipperfield,
Wayne Connelly,

D
Butch Deadmarsh,
Ray Delorenzi,
Andre Deschamps,
Ken Desjardine,
Peter Driscoll,

E
Chris Evans,

F
Mike Ford,

G
Dave Gilmour,
Bill Gratton,
Bruce Greig,
Danny Gruen,

H
Derek Haas,
Hugh Harris,
Harry Howell,
Steve Hull,
Ed Humphreys,
Paul Hurley,

I
Larry Israelson,

J
Rick Jodzio,
Ric Jordan,

K
Murray Keogan,
Veli-Pekka Ketola,
Gavin Kirk,
Dave Kryskow,

L
Francois Lacombe,
Danny Lawson,
Bob Leiter,
Richard Lemieux,
Doug Lindskog,
Jacques Locas,
Bernie Lukowich,

M
Jim Mayer,
Jim McCrimmon,
Don McLeod,
Vic Mercredi,
Joe Micheletti,
Warren Miller,
John Miszuk,
Wayne Morrin,
George Morrison,

O
Wally Olds,

P
George Pesut,
Lynn Powis,

R
Bill Reed,
Duane Rupp,

S
Rick Sentes,
Tom Serviss,
Claude St. Sauveur,

T
Don Tannahill,
Paul Terbenche,

W
Brian Walsh,
Rob Walton,
Ron Ward,
Pat Westrum,
Wayne Wood,

References
Calgary Cowboys (WHA) all-time player roster at hockeydb.com

Calgary Cowboys